Holes is a 2003 American neo-Western comedy-drama film directed by Andrew Davis and written by Louis Sachar, based on his novel of the same name, originally published in August 1998. The film stars Sigourney Weaver, Jon Voight, Patricia Arquette, Tim Blake Nelson and Shia LaBeouf.

The film was produced by Chicago Pacific Entertainment in association with Phoenix Pictures, presented by Walden Media and Walt Disney Pictures, and distributed in many markets by the distribution company Buena Vista.

Holes was released in the United States on April 18, 2003, earning $71.4 million worldwide and received generally positive reviews from critics, who praised its cast, faithfulness to its source material, and sense of nostalgia. The film is dedicated to Scott Plank, who died in a car accident six months before the film's release in October 2002.

Plot

In Texas, the Yelnats family has been cursed to be unlucky, which they blame on their ancestor Elya's failure to keep a promise to fortune teller Madame Zeroni over a century earlier in Latvia. One day, Stanley Yelnats IV is wrongfully convicted of stealing a pair of sneakers that were donated to charity by baseball player Clyde "Sweet Feet" Livingston, and is sentenced to 18 months at Camp Green Lake, a juvenile detention camp, in lieu of jail time.

The camp is in a dried lake bed where rain never falls and venomous yellow-spotted lizards proliferate. Stanley meets the warden, Louise Walker, her assistant, Mr. Sir, and camp counselor Dr. Pendanski. Prisoners, known by their nicknames—including Zero, Zig-Zag, Armpit, Squid, X-Ray, and Magnet—spend each day digging holes in the desert; they may earn a day off if they find anything interesting inside the holes. After Stanley finds a golden lipstick tube initialed K.B. and a fossil, he is accepted into the group and given the nickname Caveman. When Magnet steals Mr. Sir's bag of sunflower seeds, Stanley takes the blame and is taken by Mr. Sir to Walker's cabin. Inside, Stanley notices old wanted posters and newspapers that lead him to realize that "KB" stands for Katherine "Kissin' Kate" Barlow, an outlaw his grandfather encountered. Walker assaults Mr. Sir for his irrelevant report and allows Stanley to return to work.

Camp Green Lake's history is revealed in a series of flashbacks as a flourishing lakeside community in the 19th century. Kate romantically bonds with Sam, an African-American onion merchant who helps repair her schoolhouse. When the wealthy Charles "Trout" Walker discovers the two kissing, he spreads the word in a fit of jealousy, and the town's citizens burn down the schoolhouse and murder Sam. In retaliation, Kate becomes an outlaw hunting down Walker's men, earning her nickname by kissing the men she murders. As her legend is established, Green Lake goes into decline due to the lake's sudden evaporation. One of Kate's victims is Elya's son Stanley Yelnats Sr., who is robbed of his chest of gold and left to fend for himself in the desert. Years later, Kate has a final confrontation with the now-destitute Walkers; before allowing herself to be lethally bitten by a lizard, she boasts that neither Walker nor his descendants will find her buried fortune.

In the present, when Pendanski mocks Zero, whose real name is Hector Zeroni, the latter strikes Pendanski with a shovel and runs off. After some deliberation, Stanley searches for Hector. The pair have difficulty surviving in the desert without water. Eventually, Stanley carries the ailing Hector up the mountain, where they find a wild field of onions and a source of water, helping them regain strength; at the same time, Stanley unknowingly fulfills his ancestor's promise to the fortune teller and breaks the curse. While camping on the mountain, Hector tells Stanley that he stole Livingston's sneakers and threw them over the bridge to evade the police, only for them to inadvertently hit Stanley's head.

Returning to the camp, Stanley and Hector investigate the hole where Stanley found the lipstick and discover a chest before they are discovered by Walker, Mr. Sir, and Pendanski. They soon realize that Walker, who is Trout's granddaughter, is using the inmates to search for Barlow's treasure. The adults are unable to steal the chest from the boys, as the hole has swarmed with lizards, which do not bite Stanley and Hector due to the onions they ate earlier. The adults, puzzled, wait for the lizards to kill the boys. The next morning, the attorney general and Stanley's lawyer arrive, accompanied by Texas Rangers; the chest Stanley found is discovered to have belonged to his namesake great-grandfather. Walker; Mr. Sir, who is revealed to be a paroled criminal named Marion Sevillo; and Pendanski, who is a criminal impersonating a doctor, are arrested. Stanley and Zero are released and it rains in Green Lake for the first time in over a century. 

The Yelnats family claims the chest, which contains jewels, deeds, and promissory notes, which they share with Hector, who uses it to hire private investigators to find his missing mother, and both families live a life of financial ease as neighbors.

Cast

Production
Director Andrew Davis chose to direct Holes to show he was capable of making more than action films such as The Fugitive and Collateral Damage. He encouraged author Louis Sachar to participate in the production and adapt the novel into a screenplay. To break down the novel’s action into a film, Davis and Sachar storyboarded over 100 scenes on 3-by-5 note cards, each of which had specific time allotments. Sachar said Davis "went through and said, 'Now as you rewrite it, this card should take half a minute, this one should take three minutes, this one should take one minute, and so on.'"

Holes was filmed in California over 10 weeks in the summer of 2002 on a $20 million budget. When looking for a child actor to play Stanley, Davis asked for an actor like "a young Tom Hanks". Shia LaBeouf was cast. In the original book, Stanley is depicted as obese, shedding considerable weight as the book progresses. The filmmakers chose to drop this aspect from the movie, as they believed it would have been difficult to convincingly portray the weight loss in a live-action film.

The film was shot in several locations, including Ridgecrest, California. LaBeouf was simultaneously doing work for the Disney Channel show Even Stevens, and worked on the film after taping Even Stevens. To show the seven kids' holes being dug gradually throughout the day, different "phases" were used, for each of which the seven holes were given different levels of depth. For the yellow spotted lizards, fourteen bearded dragons were used, four of which were used for the main parts, and the rest used as "background atmosphere lizards".

Music
The film's music includes the Grammy-winning single "Just Like You" by Keb Mo', and "Dig It" by The D Tent Boys (the actors portraying the D Tent group inmates), which included a video that was played regularly on the Disney Channel. The soundtrack also includes contributions by the Eels, Devin Thompson, Dr. John, Eagle Eye Cherry, Fiction Plane, Little Axe, Moby, North Mississippi Allstars, Pepe Deluxé, Shaggy, Stephanie Bentley, and Teresa James & the Rhythm Tramps.

The score was composed and conducted by Joel McNeely.

 "Dig It" – D-Tent Boys
 "Keep'n It Real" – Shaggy
 "Mighty Fine Blues" – Eels
 "Honey" – Moby
 "I'm Gonna Be A Wheel Someday" – Teresa James & the Rhythm Tramps
 "Just Like You" – Keb' Mo'
 "Everybody Pass Me By" – Pepe Deluxé
 "I Will Survive" – Stephanie Bentley
 "Shake 'Em On Down" – North Mississippi Allstars
 "Don't Give Up" – Eagle Eye Cherry
 "Happy Dayz" – Devin Thompson
 "Let's Make A Better World" – Dr. John
 "If Only" – Fiction Plane
 "Eyes Down" – Eels
 "Down To The Valley" – Little Axe

Reception

Box office
Holes grossed $16.3 million in its opening weekend, finishing #2 at the box office behind Anger Managements second weekend. It went on to gross a domestic total of $67.4 million and an additional $4 million in international revenue, totaling $71.4 million at the box office, against a $20 million budget, making the film a moderate financial success. The film was released in the United Kingdom on October 24, 2003, and opened at #9.

Critical response
On Rotten Tomatoes the film holds an approval rating of 78% based on 139 reviews, with an average rating of 7/10. The site's critical consensus reads: "Faithful to its literary source, this is imaginative, intelligent family entertainment." On Metacritic, which uses an average of critics' reviews, the film has a 71 out of 100 rating, based on 28 critics, indicating "generally favorable reviews". Audiences polled by CinemaScore gave the film an average grade of "A" on an A+ to F scale.

Roger Ebert of the Chicago Sun-Times rated the film 3.5 of four stars and wrote, "Davis has always been a director with a strong visual sense, and the look of Holes has a noble, dusty loneliness. We feel we are actually in a limitless desert. The cinematographer, Stephen St. John, thinks big and frames his shots for an epic feel that adds weight to the story. I walked in expecting a movie for thirteen somethings, and walked out feeling challenged and satisfied. Curious, how much more grown up and sophisticated Holes is than Anger Management", which was released the same month.

Awards

References

External links

 
 
 

2003 films
2000s Western (genre) comedy films
American Western (genre) comedy films
Neo-Western films
2000s adventure comedy-drama films
2000s buddy comedy-drama films
American adventure comedy-drama films
American buddy comedy-drama films
American comedy-drama films
American mystery films
2000s English-language films
Films directed by Andrew Davis
Films based on children's books
Films about curses
Films about lizards
Films set in the 1850s
Films set in the 1890s
Films set in the 1900s
Films set in the 1990s
Films set in Texas
Films shot in California
Films shot in Los Angeles
Films about interracial romance
American prison films
Walt Disney Pictures films
Walden Media films
Films based on American novels
Films scored by Joel McNeely
Phoenix Pictures films
Films set in deserts
Films based on young adult literature
American children's comedy films
Films about child labour
Films about juvenile delinquency
2000s American films
Magic realism films